Crime Is Our Business is a 2008 French comedy mystery film directed by Pascal Thomas and starring Catherine Frot, André Dussollier and Claude Rich. It is based on the 1957 Agatha Christie novel 4.50 from Paddington (but with a change of detectives from Miss Marple to Tommy and Tuppence).

Cast
 Catherine Frot as Prudence Beresford
 André Dussollier as Bélisaire Beresford
 Claude Rich as Roderick Charpentier
 Annie Cordy as Babette Boutiti, Prudence's aunt
 Chiara Mastroianni as Emma Charpentier, daughter of Roderick
 Melvil Poupaud as Frédéric Charpentier, youngest son of Roderick
 Alexandre Lafaurie as Raphaël Charpentier, son of Roderick
 Christian Vadim as Augustin Charpentier, eldest son of Roderick
 Hippolyte Girardot as Dr. Lagarde
 Yves Afonso as Inspector Blache
 Valériane de Villeneuve as Mme Clairin
 Marie Lorna Vaconsin as Mme Valois
 Laura Benson as Margaret Brown
 Florence Maury as Diane

References

External links
 

2008 films
2008 comedy films
2000s French-language films
Films directed by Pascal Thomas
Films based on British novels
Films based on works by Agatha Christie
French sequel films
Tommy and Tuppence
2000s French films